Norman Hitchcock (born circa 1929 in Oklahoma — died August 28, 2006, in Oklahoma City, Oklahoma) was an American Pool player. Hitchcock was reported as "a national champion at billiards" and the winner the 1973 Stardust Open Championship in nine-ball.

References

1929 births
2006 deaths
American pool players
Sportspeople from Oklahoma City